Criminal investigation division may refer to:

FBI Criminal Investigative Division
IRS Criminal Investigation Division
United States Army Criminal Investigation Division
United States Marine Corps Criminal Investigation Division

See also
CID (disambiguation)
Criminal Investigation Department (disambiguation)